Ro-40 was an Imperial Japanese Navy Kaichū type submarine of the K6 sub-class. Completed and commissioned in September 1943, she served in World War II and was sunk in February 1944 during her first war patrol.

Design and description
The submarines of the K6 sub-class were versions of the preceding K5 sub-class with greater range and diving depth. They displaced  surfaced and  submerged.

For surface running, the boats were powered by two  diesel engines, each driving one propeller shaft. When submerged each propeller was driven by a  electric motor. They could reach  on the surface and  underwater.

The boats were armed with four internal bow  torpedo tubes and carried a total of ten torpedoes. They were also armed with a single  L/40 anti-aircraft gun and two single  AA guns.

Construction and commissioning

Ro-40 was laid down on 8 August 1942 by Mitsubishi at Kobe, Japan, with the name Submarine No. 206. She was renamed Ro-40 on 5 February 1943 and was attached provisionally to the Maizuru Naval District that day. She was launched on 6 March 1943 and completed and commissioned on 28 September 1943.

Service history

Upon commissioning, Ro-40 was attached formally to the Maizuru Naval District and assigned to Submarine Squadron 11 for workups. She called at Tokuyama to refuel from 2 to 4 December 1943.

On 15 January 1944, she was reassigned to Submarine Division 34. She departed Maizuru on 20 January 1944 bound for Truk, which she reached on 29 January 1944.

Ro-40 got underway from Truk on 12 February 1944 to begin her first war patrol, ordered to operate in the Marshall Islands and then proceed to a patrol area east of the Gilbert Islands in the vicinity of Makin Island. The Japanese never heard from her again.

The submarine Phelps, MacDonough, and Sage sank probably was Ro-40. The commander-in-chief of the 6th Fleet, Vice Admiral Takeo Takagi, ordered her to a new patrol area between Kwajalein and Eniwetok on 20 February 1944 and ordered her to return to Truk on 4 March 1944, but she did not acknowledge either order. On 28 March 1944, the Imperial Japanese Navy declared her to be presumed lost in the Gilbert Islands area with all 61 hands. She was stricken from the Navy list on 30 April 1944.

Notes

References
 

 

Ro-35-class submarines
Kaichū type submarines
Ships built by Mitsubishi Heavy Industries
1943 ships
World War II submarines of Japan
Japanese submarines lost during World War II
World War II shipwrecks in the Pacific Ocean
Maritime incidents in October 1943
Maritime incidents in February 1944
Ships lost with all hands
Submarines sunk by United States warships